Special Edition of the 2012 edition of El Gran Show, it was the second season of 2012 and premiered on November 24, 2012.

In this season, the telephone vote in the duel was eliminated, being the couple saved the one that obtains the highest score. In the final, the winning couple was chosen only by the public vote, so there was no secret vote. In addition, the couples were divided into two teams, each one had as a coach Maricielo Effio or Belén Estévez, former contestants of the show; the winning couple of the season would turn their respective coach into winner.

On December 29, 2012, actress & TV host Karen Dejo and Oreykel Hidalgo were declared the winners, singer & actress Micheille Soifer and Christian Navarro finished second, while former MDO singer Alexis Grullón and Stephanie Palacios were third.

Cast

Couples 
For this season 8 celebrities were announced, including Karen Dejo, Miguel "Conejo" Rebosio, Pierina Carcelén and Delly Madrid. Alexis Grullón, who was a judge last season, competed as a celebrity. For this season Maricielo Effio and Belén Estévez returned, playing as coaches. Sergio Lois was the only professional dancer who returned from last season, the rest of the dancers are new to the dance floor.

During the show, Delly Madrid suffered an injury during the first week in the live show, being replaced in the following weeks by Belén Estévez, Leslie Shaw, Emilia Drago and Pamela Mármol until her recovery. Even so, because his period of recovery would take longer than expected, Madrid decided to withdraw the competition.

Host and judges 
Gisela Valcárcel, Aldo Díaz and Óscar López Arias returned as hosts, while Morella Petrozzi, Pachi Valle Riestra and the VIP Jury returned as judges. Carlos Cacho, former judge in Bailando por un sueño, and Rosanna Lignarolo, judge in the Segundo Campeonato Mundial de Baile, entered the show as new judges.

Scoring charts 

Red numbers indicate the sentenced for each week
Green numbers indicate the best steps for each week
 the couple was eliminated that week
 the couple was safe in the duel
 the couple was eliminated that week and safe with a lifeguard
 this couple withdrew from the competition
 the winning couple
 the runner-up couple
 the third-place couple

Average score chart 
This table only counts dances scored on a 40-point scale (the VIP jury scores are excluded).

Highest and lowest scoring performances 
The best and worst performances in each dance according to the judges' 40-point scale (the VIP jury scores are excluded) are as follows:

Couples' highest and lowest scoring dances 
Scores are based upon a potential 40-point maximum (the VIP jury scores are excluded).

Weekly scores 
Individual judges' scores in the charts below (given in parentheses) are listed in this order from left to right: Morella Petrozzi, Carlos Cacho, Rosanna Lignarolo, Pachi Valle Riestra, VIP Jury.

Week 1: Latin Pop Night 
The couples danced latin pop and a team dance of hula.

During the team dances, Delly Madrid suffered a serious accident in her head, canceling the team round. 
Running order

Week 2: Movie Night 
The couples (except those sentenced) performed one unlearned ballroom dance to famous film songs. In the versus, the couples faced dancing different dance styles.

Due to the Delly Madrid injury, Belén Estévez replaced her in the chachacha and Leslie Shaw in the versus.
Running order

*The duel
Pierina & Juan Pablo: Eliminated
Flor & Jorge: Safe

Week 3: Cumbia & Disco Night 
The couples danced cumbia and disco (except those sentenced).

Flor Polo suffered an injury at the end of her cumbia dance, so she could not dance her disco routine, being automatically sentenced.

Due to the Delly Madrid injury, Emilia Drago replaced her in the cumbia and Pamela Mármol in the disco. Finally, when it was announced that Alexis & Stephanie were eliminated, Madrid decided to withdraw the competition and give its place to the couple.
Running order

*The duel
Alexis & Stephanie: Eliminated (but then saved)
Conejo & Karen: Safe

Week 4: Quarterfinals 
The couples (except those sentenced) danced k-pop or latin pop, a heroes dance and a team dance. The heroes dance involved the celebrities dancing side by side to the same song and receiving the same set of scores from the judges for the routine.
Running order

*The duel
Flor & Jorge: Eliminated (but safe with the lifeguard)
Néstor & Mónica: Safe

Week 5: Semifinals 
The couples danced a favorite dance, adagio (except those sentenced) and a danceathon of jazz. This week, none couples were sentenced.
Running order

*The duel
Néstor & Mónica: Safe
Flor & Jorge: Eliminated

Week 6: Finals 
On the first part, the couples danced cumbia and freestyle.

On the second part, the final four couples danced waltz.
Running order (Part 1)

Running order (Part 2)

Dance chart 
The celebrities and professional partners will dance one of these routines for each corresponding week:
 Week 1: Latin pop & team dances (Latin Pop Night)
 Week 2: Ballroom dances & the versus (Movie Night)
 Week 3: Cumbia & disco (Cumbia & Disco Night)
 Week 4: K-pop or latin pop, heroes dances & team dances (Quarterfinals)
 Week 5: Favorite dance, adagio & team dances (Semifinals)
 Week 6: Cumbia, freestyle & waltz (Finals)

 Highest scoring dance
 Lowest scoring dance
 Not scored or danced by the celebrity
 Gained bonus points for winning this dance
 Gained no bonus points for losing this dance
In Italic indicate the dances performed in the duel

Notes

References

External links 

El Gran Show
2012 Peruvian television seasons
Reality television articles with incorrect naming style